Francisco de Matos Vieira, better known as Vieira Lusitano (4 October 1699 – 13 August 1783) was a Portuguese court painter, illustrator and engraver.

Biography
His father was a maker of socks and stockings. He was originally meant to pursue an ecclesiastical career, but when he displayed an aptitude for art, his parents changed their plans. Word of his talents reached Carnide, where some gentlemen who operated a literary academy asked to meet him. During his presentation to them, he met a girl named Inês Helena de Lima e Melo, who would become his lifelong passion.  

Meanwhile, he had begun his studies, probably with André Gonçalves. His work came to the attention of the Marquis of Fontes, who had recently been appointed Ambassador to Rome. The Marquis offered to take Vieira with him, so he could continue his studies there, and his family accepted the offer.

Once there, aged only thirteen, he was apprenticed to Benedetto Luti, who immediately set him to studying and copying the frescoes in the Farnese Gallery. Meanwhile, the Marquis directed him to paint religious ceremonies, ornaments at the Basilica of Saint Peter, fixtures at the Portuguese Embassy and even the Marquis' own carriage. When it came time for the Marquis to return home, he wanted to take Vieira with him, but relented when Vieira begged to remain. He was allowed to stay for two more years and studied with Francesco Trevisani.

Marriage and its aftermath
Returning home after seven years, he was commissioned by King John V to paint a large "Blessed Sacrament" for the Corpus Christi procession. His relationship with Inês was not going well, however, as her parents felt that he was of inferior social status and they would not consent to the marriage. Despite this, they arranged a marriage by proxy. When her parents found out, they took her to a convent and forced her to take vows. Vieira tried to gain her release but, failing that, decided to appeal to the Pope himself. He remained in Rome for five years, pressing his petitions and continuing to paint.

Finally acknowledging defeat, he returned to Lisbon in 1728. Somehow, he arranged to have male clothing smuggled in to Inês so, dressed as a man, she simply walked out of the convent. When it was discovered that she was missing, her relatives hired a hooligan to avenge their honor. Vieira was shot as he walked down the street and seriously injured. When he recovered, he sought justice from King John V, but his wife's family was influential and the would-be assassin was allowed to flee the country. Fearing for his safety, Vieira entered the Paulist convent then, in 1732, went to Seville, to work for King Philip V.

Court Painter
Upon his return to Lisbon the following year, he was named Court Painter and retained that position under King Joseph I. In 1744, he was appointed Knight of the Order of Saint James of the Sword. During his tenure with the court, he painted portraits of the royal family, and worked prolifically at numerous public buildings and churches. Many of those works were destroyed in the earthquake of 1755.

In 1775, his beloved Inês died. Stricken with grief, he gave up painting and entered the Convento do Beato, where he remained until his death. While there, he composed a long poem in lyrical cantos called O insigne pintor e leal esposo, história verdadeira... (Illustrious painter and loyal husband, a true story). It was printed in 1780. That same year, he accepted a largely honorary appointment as Director of the "Nude Academy" (later, the "Royal Academy of Fine Arts").

Portraits of the Royal Family

References

Further reading
 Luiz Xavier da Costa, Francisco Vieira Lusitano, poeia e abridor de águas-fortes, Imprensa da Universidade, 1929
 Luísa Arruda and José Alberto Seabra Carvalho, Vieira Lusitano, 1699-1783, o desenho: Museu Nacional de Arte Antiga, 18 maio - 2 julho 2000 (exhibition catalog), Museu Nacional de Arte Antiga, 2000,

External links

Works by Vieira @ the National Library of Portugal
Scholarly articles in English about Francisco Vieira de Matos, known as Vieira Lusitano both in web and PDF @ the Spanish Old Masters Gallery

1699 births
1783 deaths
18th-century Portuguese painters
18th-century male artists
Portuguese male painters
Painters at the Portuguese royal court
Portrait painters
People from Lisbon
Portuguese engravers
Recipients of the Order of Saint James of the Sword